Handguns is an American pop punk band originally from Harrisburg, Pennsylvania and later based in Baltimore.

History
Blending emo and pop punk, the band self-released three EPs before signing to Pure Noise Records in 2011, the label releasing fourth EP Don't Bite Your Tongue that year.  Their debut album, Angst, was released on September 25, 2012 on Pure Noise Records. Handguns toured Japan in December 2012  and toured Europe in Spring 2013 with Senses Fail. The band's second album, Life Lessons, was released in 2014. Handguns played all of the Vans Warped tour in the summer of 2013 and 2015. Their next album was titled Disenchanted, and released in November 2015. A review in Exclaim! described it as "underwhelming", with the band "stuck in a rut".
In a more positive review of the album, Connor Welsh of New Transcendence called the album "a relevant and relatable release for honestly, just about everyone."

By 2012 all of the original members had left, and the band had undergone multiple changes of personnel. On October 6, 2017, at a show in Carlisle, Pennsylvania, the band announced that the 2010 line up were reuniting to record a new album together on their record label Pass Along Knowledge Yourself and play some shows. Following that, the band embarked on the 'When The Tour Burns Out' tour in support of their album When The Light Burns Out with comedian Ron "Cheesefoot" Smith. 

They have toured with bands such as Man Overboard, The Wonder Years, Dead Cheetos, Jazz Hog, Parade Wave, Forever Came Calling and Roam.

Members
Current
 Taylor Eby - lead vocals (2010-present)
 Jake Langley - lead guitar, backing vocals (2008–2012, 2017–present)
 Nate Bobb - bass guitar, backing vocals (2008-2012, 2017–present)
 Marco Florey - drums, percussion (2008-2011, 2017–present)
 Billy Tray - rhythm guitar, backing vocals (2017–present)

Former
 Kevin Cale - lead guitar (2008)
 Joshua Hurst - lead vocals (2008)
 Adam Fields - drums (2008)
 Brandon Gepfer - lead vocals (2008-2009)
 Cody Bunce - bass guitar (2008-2009)
 Woody Spokas - drums, percussion (2012-2014)
 Brandon Pagano - lead guitar, backing vocals (2012-2017)
 C.J. Wilson - bass guitar, backing vocals (2012-2017)
 Kyle Vaught - rhythm guitar, backing vocals (2012-2017)
 Ryan Pyle - drums, percussion (2014-2017)

Discography
Studio albums 
 Angst (Pure Noise, 2012) U.S. #155
 Life Lessons (Pure Noise, 2014)
 Disenchanted (Pure Noise, 2015)
 When The Light Burns Out (PAKY/Penultimate Records, 2020)

Extended plays 
 Demo 2008 (PAKY, 2008)
 MMIX Summer Tour EP (PAKY,2009)
 Anywhere But Home (PAKY, 2010)
 Don't Bite Your Tongue'' (Pure Noise, 2011)
 Split 7" with Forever Came Calling (Pure Noise, 2011)

References

Emo musical groups
Pop punk groups from Pennsylvania
Pure Noise Records artists